The Ancienne Laiterie de Madame is a dairy built by Jean-François-Thérèse Chalgrin in 1780 for Marie Josephine Louise of Savoy, spouse of Louis XVIII of France located in Versailles.

External links
 Ministère de la Culture.

Buildings and structures in Versailles
Industrial buildings completed in 1780
18th-century architecture in France